The St. Catharines City Council is the governing body of the City of St. Catharines, Ontario, Canada.

The council consists of the mayor plus twelve elected councillors, with two councilors representing each of the six municipal wards. A deputy mayor is selected from among the city councillors who serves as acting mayor in the absence of the mayor.

Council
As of the 2022 Niagara Region municipal elections#St. Catharines
Mayor
Mat Siscoe
Merriton Ward
Jackie Lindal
Greg Miller
St. Andrew's Ward
Matthew Harris
Joseph Kushner
St. George's Ward
Mark Stevens 
Kevin Townsend
St. Patrick's Ward
Caleb Ratzlaff
Robin McPherson
Grantham Ward
Dawn Dodge
Bill Phillips
Port Dalhousie Ward
Carlos Garcia
Bruce Williamson

See also
Niagara Regional Council

References
Mayor & Council

Municipal councils in Ontario
Municipal government of St. Catharines